The City Road Goods branch was a goods only branch serving the Lister Hills area of Bradford, West Yorkshire, England.

History

Proposed as part of the Bradford and Thornton Railways Act (1865), later withdrawn but then incorporated (24 July 1871) and amalgamated with the Great Northern Railway (18 July 1872). It closed when goods services were withdrawn from the stub of the St Dunstans to Thornton line on 26 August 1972.

The warehouses were converted into offices of a haulage company. However, they were destroyed in a fire in the 1980s.

References 

Disused railway stations in Bradford
Disused railway goods stations in Great Britain